Anderson was a railway station on the Wonthaggi line located near Anderson, Victoria. The station operated until the line's closure in 1978. The site of this station is now a carpark and the starting point of the Bass Coast Rail Trail.

Disused railway stations in Victoria (Australia)
Transport in Gippsland (region)
Bass Coast Shire